Huntington Woods is a city in Oakland County, Michigan in the U.S. state of Michigan.  It is a northern suburb of Metro Detroit.  The population was 6,238 at the 2010 census.

Huntington Woods is situated along the Woodward Corridor (M-1) and is bounded by Ten and Eleven Mile Roads to the north and south and by Woodward and Coolidge Highway to the east and west. The city is widely known as the "City of Homes", as it consists mostly of residences. Rackham Golf Course is located along the southern end of the city. The western portion of the Detroit Zoo is located within the city limits and is a contributor to its tax base.

Geography
Rackham Golf Course, owned by the city of Detroit, makes up 20% (0.3 square miles) of the total area of the city.

Huntington Woods is adjacent to the cities of Pleasant Ridge to the southeast, Oak Park to the south and west, Royal Oak to the east, and Berkley to the north.

Huntington Woods is bordered to the south by 10 Mile Road/I-696, to the west by Coolidge Highway, to the east by Woodward Avenue (M-1), Hendrie Boulevard, York Road, Dundee Road, and Hereford Road, and to the north by 11 Mile Road.

Demographics

Huntington Woods has the highest percentage of Jews of any municipality in the state.  65% of households in the 48070 zip code — which covers all of Huntington Woods and the small portion of the uninhabited Detroit Zoo in Royal Oak — identified as Jewish.

2010 census
As of the census of 2010, there were 6,238 people, 2,354 households, and 1,784 families living in the city. The racial makeup of the city was 96.0% White, 1.0% African American, 0.2% Native American, 1.3% Asian, 0.5% from other races, and 1.1% from two or more races. Hispanic or Latino of any race were 1.6% of the population.

There were 2,354 households, of which 38.0% had children under the age of 18 living with them, 66.9% were married couples living together, 6.4% had a female householder with no husband present, 2.5% had a male householder with no wife present, and 24.2% were non-families. 19.8% of all households were made up of individuals, and 9.1% had someone living alone who was 65 years of age or older. The average household size was 2.65 and the average family size was 3.08.

The median age in the city was 42 years. 27.4% of residents were under the age of 18; 3.8% were between the ages of 18 and 24; 23.6% were from 25 to 44; 31.6% were from 45 to 64; and 13.6% were 65 years of age or older. The gender makeup of the city was 49.2% male and 50.8% female.

2000 census
As of the census of 2000, there were 6,151 people, 2,381 households, and 1,802 families living in the city. The racial makeup of the city was 96.96% White, 0.68% African American, 0.05% Native American, 1.41% Asian, 0.26% from other races, and 0.63% from two or more races. Hispanic or Latino of any race were 0.88% of the
population.
 
There were 2,381 households, out of which 37.6% had children under the age of 18 living with them, 67.2% were married couples living together, 7.0% had a female householder with no husband present, and 24.3% were non-families. 19.5% of all households were made up of individuals, and 7.8% had someone living alone who was 65 years of age or older.  The average household size was 2.58 and the average family size was 3.01.

In the city, the population was spread out, with 26.6% under the age of 18, 3.3% from 18 to 24, 27.8% from 25 to 44, 29.7% from 45 to 64, and 12.7% who were 65 years of age or older.  The median age was 41 years. For every 100 females, there were 95.3 males.  For every 100 females age 18 and over, there were 91.0 males.

The median income for a household in the city was $87,086, and the median income for a family was $97,055. Males had a median income of $73,750 versus $43,565 for females. The per capita income for the city was $45,264.  About 1.8% of families and 2.6% of the population were below the poverty line, including 3.2% of those under age 18 and 2.3% of those age 65 or over.

Education
All residents live within Berkley School District boundaries.

Many residents also attend local private schools, such as University of Detroit Jesuit High School, Detroit Country Day School, Shrine Catholic High School, The Roeper School, Farber Hebrew Day School, Hillel Day School, Cranbrook-Kingswood School, Brother Rice High School, and Mercy High School.

Notable people
Kristen Bell, actress
 Danny Fenster, American journalist formerly imprisoned in Myanmar on charges of incitement and sedition by that country's military junta
 Rachel Jacobs, social entrepreneur
 Angela Povilaitis, former assistant attorney general who led the prosecution of Larry Nassar
 Jef Mallett, artist and writer of the syndicated comic strip Frazz, current resident
Ellen Lipton, American politician and former Democratic member of the Michigan State House of Representatives
Ellen Sandweiss, actress
Justin Wedes, community activist and social entrepreneur, co-founder of Occupy Wall Street
Jan van der Marck, Dutch-born American museum administrator, curator, and art historian, he lived in Huntington Woods for more than 20 years.

See also

 Woodward Corridor

References

External links
City of Huntington Woods official website

Cities in Oakland County, Michigan
Metro Detroit
1926 establishments in Michigan
Populated places established in 1926